Mike Larkan (born 1964) is an Australian television presenter.

Career 
He is best known for his work on 10 News First, providing weather reports on location at various popular locations around the city of Melbourne.

Mike Larkan began his career as a clerk in the sporting section of the Sydney Sun in 1976, working for the then editor Derryn Hinch. About the same time, he landed small acting roles in TV soapies and commercials and played guitar in a garage band.

After completing a part-time radio course, Mike landed jobs at 2NZ, 2TM in New South Wales and 4BU in Queensland as a disc jockey.

Near the end of 1982, Mike began travelling extensively visiting Europe, North Africa and the United States.  His versatility had him turning his hand at many jobs including picking olives in Greece, pouring beer in a London pub, milking cows in Israel and even working as an extra a Hollywood movie!

Upon his return to Australia two years later in 1984, Mike joined Capital Television (now 10 Regional) in Canberra writing and reporting for the evening news and reading news updates. When the opportunity arose to become Capital’s weatherman, Mike seized it and turned what was just a weather report, into an entertaining, informative and often humorous weather segment.  He also returned to radio on 2CA.

In 1996 Mike was lured from Canberra to become TEN Melbourne's weather presenter.  Whatever the weather you will find Mike out there in the thick of it doing his unique live crosses from Melbourne landmarks including Federation Square, Southgate, Scienceworks, Melbourne Zoo, Flemington Racecourse, the Aquarium (with the sharks) Primary Schools and the beach.  One memorable moment happened when a rhino at the Open Range Zoo at Werribee charged the news car he was sitting in preparing his script for the day – all captured by the news camera crew!

Mike hosts many of TEN's special events including the prestigious Young Australian of the Year Awards. He also has a daily weather spot on the popular Ernie Sigley show on radio 3AW. Mike is also one of a select few to be nominated as an Australia Day Ambassador and Melbourne Zoo Ambassador. He regularly hosts charity events, openings, carols by candlelight and presents weekly motivational talks to primary and secondary students around Melbourne.  Through his own company, Mike conducts corporate trivia/games nights under the banner of Larkanabout, with Mike.

Mike, whose family originally came from Canberra, lives in a Bayside suburb with his wife Kathy.  They have two children.

He also does charity work, such as Mike Larkan's Give a Dog a Home.

He was also in a band called Freedom which he described his musical talent as "dodgy".

In August 2020, he was made redundant by Network 10 as part of a centralised news bulletin that will begin next month.

References

External links
 Network Ten Profile

Weather presenters
10 News First presenters
Living people
1964 births